The hip is an anatomical region and a joint.

Hip or HIP may also refer to:

Science and technology
 Hip bone, in adults one of the bones of the pelvis
 HIP, a prefix for a star in the Hipparcos Catalogue
 High-impact polystyrene (HIPS) or high-impact plastic
 Hot isostatic pressing, a heat and pressure treatment applied to metals and alloys
 Huntingtin Interacting Protein
 Hip-1, Huntingtin Interacting Protein 1
 HIP2, Huntingtin Interacting Protein 2
 HIP1R
 Head in pillow (metallurgy), a solder joint defect on BGAs

Computing
 Host-based intrusion-prevention system (HIPS), a computer security system
 Human interaction proof, a CAPTCHA
 Host Identity Protocol (HIP), a computer protocol
 Heterogeneous(-compute) Interface for Portability, a parallel (GPU) computing platform by AMD and an alternative to CUDA by Nvidia

Organizations
 Health Insurance Plan, see Health care finance in the United States
 Health Insurance Plan of New Jersey, a defunct Health Maintenance Organization
 Health Insurance Plan of New York, a Health Maintenance Organization
 Healthy Indiana Plan, a health plan in Indiana that was established by Governor Mitch Daniels
 Hillsborough Independent Panel; see Hillsborough disaster
 Helsinki Institute of Physics, Finland

Places
 Highams Park railway station (National Rail station code), England
 Harlem Irving Plaza, an enclosed mall in Norridge, Illinois, commonly referred to as "The HIP"

Music
 Hip (album), by the Danish band Steppeulvene
 Hip Records, a record label
 The Tragically Hip, a Canadian rock band also referred to as The Hip
 Historically informed performance, a practice of performing European classical music on period instruments
 "Hip", a single by South Korean girl group Mamamoo

Other uses
 Hip Linkchain (1936-1989), American guitarist
 Hypertension in Pregnancy, a medical journal
 Home Improvement Programme, in Singapore
 Home Information Pack, a set of documents about a United Kingdom residential property
 Hip (slang), a slang term meaning fashionably current
 Mil Mi-8 "Hip", a Russian helicopter
 Human Instrumentality Project, fictional term from the anime Neon Genesis Evangelion

See also
 Hip roof, a component of a roof
 Rose hip, the fruit of the rose
 Hip hip hooray, a cheer
 Ontario Health Insurance Plan (OHIP)